Dhritiman Chatterjee is an Indian actor. He began his acting career in 1970 as the protagonist of Satyajit Ray's Pratidwandi (The Adversary). Most of his acting work has been in India's "parallel", or independent, cinema with filmmakers such as Satyajit Ray, Mrinal Sen and Aparna Sen, among others and is noted for his acting skills. He has also worked in English films with well-known filmmakers such as Deepa Mehta and Jane Campion.

Early life 
Dhritiman is his screen name. He is otherwise known as Sundar Chatterjee and is quite active on the English stage in Chennai. Born on 30 May 1945, he was educated at Kolkata's St Xavier's Collegiate School and Presidency College, and the Delhi School of Economics. Chatterjee went on to pursue a parallel career in advertising, social communications and documentary filmmaking.

Career 
In 2019, Chatterjee lent his voice for narration in If Not for You, a documentary about Kolkata's long lasting love affair with legendary singer-songwriter Bob Dylan. About his acting qualities, Satyajit Ray once remarked, "I do not know what definition of a star these filmmakers have been using, but mine goes something like this. A star is a person on the screen who continues to be expressive and interesting even after he or she has stopped doing anything. This definition does not exclude the rare and lucky breed that gets lakhs of rupees per film; and it includes everyone who keeps his calm before the camera, projects a personality and evokes empathy. This is a rare breed too but one has met it in our films. Dhritiman Chatterjee of Pratidwandi is such a star." - (Our Films Their Films) 

Never a part of mainstream "Bollywood", he's made an astonishingly small number of films. In recent years he's taken roles with filmmakers as diverse as Jane Campion and hugely successful Mumbai directors Sanjay Leela Bhansali and Mani Ratnam. Dhritiman has received several acting awards in India and has been on the Jury of the Indian National film Awards.

He is currently the anchor of Pradhanmantri in Bengali on ABP Ananda from 14 December 2013.

Filmography

Films

Hindi

English

Sinhala

Malayalam

Web series

See also

 Barun Chanda
 Pradhanmantri (TV Series)

References

External links
 
 

Male actors from Kolkata
Bengali male actors
Male actors in Bengali cinema
University of Calcutta alumni
Living people
1945 births
20th-century Indian male actors
21st-century Indian male actors